The ovate clubshell (Pleurobema perovatum) is an extinct species of freshwater mussel within the family of Unionidae.

This species was endemic to the Mobile River Basin in Alabama and Mississippi and was not seen since the early 20th century.

References

Molluscs of the United States
Pleurobema
Bivalves described in 1834
ESA endangered species
Taxonomy articles created by Polbot